Nottinghamshire Police is the territorial police force responsible for policing the shire county of Nottinghamshire and the unitary authority of Nottingham in the East Midlands area of England. The area has a population of just over 1 million.

The force headquarters are at Arnold. As of April 2022, the force had 2,238 police officers, 1,465 police staff including PCSOs, around 163 special constables, 113 police support volunteers, 19 student placement volunteers and 131 police cadets.

The chief constable is Kate Meynell, appointed from nearby Derbyshire Constabulary in December 2022, who followed Craig Guildford, in-post since February 2017.

Nottinghamshire Police Authority, which governed the force, was disbanded in November 2012, when the first Nottinghamshire Police and Crime Commissioner was elected.

Police area
The police area covers the ceremonial county of Nottinghamshire, which contains the following local authorities:

Map showing Local Authorities within the Police Area.

Workforce

History
Nottinghamshire Constabulary was established in 1840. The following year it absorbed Retford Borough Police. In 1947, it absorbed Newark-on-Trent Borough Police. In 1968 it amalgamated with Nottingham City Police to form Nottinghamshire Combined Constabulary. On 1 April 1974, it was reconstituted as Nottinghamshire Police under the Local Government Act 1972, but retained the name Nottinghamshire Constabulary on all signage, uniform and vehicles until the early 21st century.

In 1965, Nottinghamshire Constabulary had an establishment of 1,026 officers and an actual strength of 798.

Proposals made by the Home Secretary in March 2006, would have seen the force merge with the other four East Midlands forces to form a strategic police force for the entire region. However, in July 2006 the proposed merger was cancelled.

In June 2006, the force was declared effective and efficient by Her Majesty's Inspectorate of Constabulary (HMIC) after five years of intense scrutiny.

In 2009, a performance assessment carried out by the government ranked the force's operational area as the third worst in the country.

In March 2010, HMIC rated the force as 'poor' in three reviewed areas of, 'Local Policing', 'Confidence' and 'Protecting from Harm'. Nottinghamshire Police were the only force in England & Wales to receive such a rating. Although HMIC did not attempt to place the 43 police forces in England & Wales in a directly comparable league table (due to difficulties in comparing a large city force with a small rural force), Nottinghamshire Police did give HMIC cause for concern. The media portrayed the analysis as showing the force as the 'worst in England & Wales'.

Chief constables
Chief constables were:
 Nottingham City / Borough of Nottingham Police
18141833 Richard Birth
1833? William Barnes
18601865 Joseph Hedington 
18651869 John Freeman (former chief constable of Plymouth)
18691872 Captain F. Parry
18721881 Major William Henry Poyntz (appointed chief constable of Essex)
18811892 Samuel Stevens (former chief constable of Rochdale)
18921912 Phillip Stephen Clay (former chief constable of Southampton)
19121930 Lt. Col. F. Lemon
19301959 Captain Athelstan Popkess
19601968 Thomas Moore
In 1968, Nottingham City Police merged with Nottinghamshire Constabulary

Nottinghamshire County Constabulary
1852 Peter Valetine Hatton (dismissed for inefficiency)
18521856 Captain John Henry Forrest  (later appointed chief constable of Hampshire)
18561892 Captain Henry Holden
18921922 Captain Sir William Hugh Tomasson
19491970 John Edward Stevenson Browne
19701976 Rex Fletcher
19761987 Charles McLachlan
19871990 Sir Ronald Hadfield (knighted in 1995 Birthday Honours)
19901995 Sir Dan Crompton
19952000 Colin Bailey
20002008 Steven Green
20082012 Julia Hodson
20122016 Chris Eyre
20162017 Susannah Fish (acting chief constable )
20172022 Craig Guildford
2022present Kate Meynell

Officers killed in the line of duty

The Police Memorial Trust lists and commemorates all British police officers killed in the line of duty, and since its establishment in 1984 has erected over 38 memorials nationally to some of those officers.

The following officers of Nottinghamshire Police are listed by the Trust as having died attempting to prevent, stop or solve a crime, since the turn of the 20th century:
Sergeant Ernest Crowston, 1921 (fatally injured attempting to stop a speeding vehicle)
PC Raymond Free, 1950 (collapsed after attending a domestic disturbance)
PC Stephen Atkinson 1977 (Fatally injured in an accident when hit by a car while on point duty)
PC Christopher John MacDonald, 1978 (beaten and drowned by burglar)
PC Gerald Walker, 2003 (fatally injured when dragged by a stolen vehicle)

Divisional structure
In April 2018, the force restructured under chief constable Craig Guildford, and moved to a local policing model. Response teams moved back in alignment with local authority areas and local council boundaries. The force was then split into two response divisions:

 North (Bassetlaw, Newark & Sherwood, Mansfield, Ashfield, Gedling, City North)
 South (City Central, City south, Broxtowe Borough, Rushcliffe Borough).

As part of the restructure, the organisation moved response teams back locally, increasing the number of response bases from nine to 20.

Each Division was managed by a Demand Management Inspector (DMI) who is responsible for demand on their area.

Custody suites

There are two custody suites across the force: Bridewell (70 cells) and Mansfield (30 cells) Newark custody suite has recently closed, however is able to be reopened if there is operational need.

Neighbourhood policing 
Each local authority area is covered by a Neighbourhood Policing Team (NPT). Each Neighbourhood policing team is run by a neighbourhood policing inspector, also referred to as the district commander.

Operational Support 
Operational support policing for the force between 2015 and May 2018 was provided by the East Midlands Operational Support Service (EMOpSS), a multi-force alliance which provides roads policing, police dogs, armed response and other specialist services over Nottinghamshire, Leicestershire, Lincolnshire and Northamptonshire. In May 2018, Operational Support Policing withdrew from the regional collaboration and a new department was established. 
Air support for the force is provided by the National Police Air Service, who closed the former Nottinghamshire/Derbyshire Air Support Unit at Ripley in early 2015. Cover is now provided from further afield using the nearest available aircraft. This function was previously supplied to the force by a joint venture with Derbyshire Police, the North Midlands Helicopter Support Unit. In 2020, the air support has also been provided by a fixed-wing aircraft flying out of Doncaster-Sheffield airport.

Dog theft 
In March 2021, Nottinghamshire Police became the first police force in the United Kingdom to appoint a dedicated dog theft lead, following increased rates of dog abductions during the coronavirus pandemic. The inspector would take a leading role in investigating cases of dognapping, work with Nottinghamshire Police’s Dog Section to produce advice for owners on how to keep their pet safe, and develop a 'Canine Coalition’ with dog welfare organisations to work together to both tackle the scourge of dog theft locally, and lobby Government for tougher sentences for dognappers.

On 15 March 2021, Chief Inspector Amy Styles-Jones was appointed to the role.

PEEL inspection
His Majesty's Inspectorate of Constabulary and Fire & Rescue Services (HMICFRS) conducts a periodic police effectiveness, efficiency and legitimacy (PEEL) inspection of each police service's performance. In its latest PEEL inspection, Nottinghamshire Police was rated as follows:

See also
List of law enforcement agencies in the United Kingdom, Crown Dependencies and British Overseas Territories
Law enforcement in the United Kingdom

Footnotes

External links

 Nottinghamshire Police at HMICFRS

Police forces of England
Police
Police
1840 establishments in England
Government agencies established in 1840